Orange Township is the name of three townships in Indiana:
Orange Township, Fayette County, Indiana
Orange Township, Noble County, Indiana
Orange Township, Rush County, Indiana

Indiana township disambiguation pages